S45 is a line on the Berlin S-Bahn. It operates from Flughafen BER Terminal 1–2 beneath Berlin Brandenburg Airport to Südkreuz over:
a very short section of the Outer ring, opened in 1951 and electrified in 1983, 
a short section of the former Outer freight ring opened in the early 1940s and electrified in 1983,
the Görlitz line, opened in 1866 and electrified in 1929, 
the Baumschulenweg–Neukölln link line, opened on 8 June 1896 and electrified in 1928 and 
the Ring line, completed in 1877 and electrified in 1926.

History
A southern extension from the former terminus at the Schönefeld Airport station has been constructed prior to the opening of the new Berlin Brandenburg Airport. The rail extension includes include two new stops: Waßmannsdorf and Terminals 1–2 at Berlin Brandenburg Airport. Due to the opening of the new airport, Schönefeld Airport station has been renamed to Flughafen BER - Terminal 5 station.

References

Berlin S-Bahn lines

fi:S45 (Berliinin S-Bahn)